Political and economic relations exist between the State of Palestine and the Kingdom of Bahrain. The State of Palestine has an embassy in Manama. But Bahrain does not have a representative office or embassy in the State of Palestine. The two countries form part of the Middle East region and share strong and similar cultural ties together.  Hundreds of Palestinians reside in Bahrain to live and work.

Relapse in relationships 
The holding of the Bahrain Economic Peace Conference or also called Peace to Prosperity workshop on June 25 and 26, 2019, sparked controversy. Palestinian leaders rejected the plan and boycotted the conference. Palestinian Prime Minister Muhammad Shtayyeh said: “The content of the American workshop in the Bahraini capital, Manama, is poor, and its representation is weak and its outputs will be sterile.”

On September 11, 2020, relations between the two countries deteriorated due to the Bahrain–Israel normalization agreement and the subsequent recall by the State of Palestine of its ambassador Khaled Aref. The Palestinian leadership also announced its strong rejection and denunciation of the US-Bahraini-Israeli tripartite declaration.

See also 
 Foreign relations of the State of Palestine
 Embassy of the State of Palestine in Bahrain

References

Bahrain
Palestine
Bahrain–State of Palestine relations